Relativity Space is an American aerospace manufacturing company headquartered in Long Beach, California. It was founded in 2015 by Tim Ellis and Jordan Noone. Relativity Space is developing manufacturing technologies, launch vehicles and rocket engines for commercial orbital launch services.

History 
Relativity Space was founded in 2015 by CEO Tim Ellis and CTO Jordan Noone on the idea that existing private spaceflight companies were not tapping enough into the potential of additive manufacturing (3D printing). Relativity is aiming to be the first company to successfully launch a fully 3D-printed launch vehicle into orbit.

In November 2020, Relativity Space announced its US$500 million Series D funding at a calculated US$2.3 billion valuation. In June 2021 Relativity announced another US$650 million funding round led by Fidelity Investments at a valuation of US$4.2 billion, bringing its total funding to US$1.335 billion. The funding will help the development of a fully reusable medium lift launch vehicle, the Terran R, targeting the first orbital launch not earlier than 2024.  Relativity Space has investors including Baillie Gifford, Blackrock, BOND, Coatue, Fidelity, General Catalyst, ICONIQ Capital, K5 Global, Mark Cuban, Playground Global, Social Capital, Tiger Global, Tribe Capital, Y Combinator, etc. 

In June 2022, it was reported that Relativity Space will be sending OneWeb’s second-gen broadband satellites to orbit in 2025. The mission will be completed using the Terran R, which marked a total value of binding launch deals for that rocket to over $1.2 billion despite the company having yet to have launched their first rocket.

The company's initial attempt to launch its first rocket, named Terran 1, on March 8, 2023 was scrubbed due to technical issues, with an second attempt anticipated for March 11, 2023, which was also scrubbed.

Facilities

Headquarters 
Relativity Space announced a new  Long Beach, California headquarters and factory in February 2020. , the new headquarters is planned to house both business operations and Relativity's autonomous development operations that the company plans to build into a modern rocket manufacturing factory in the coming years. According to an interview with CEO Tim Ellis in early 2020, the factory is planned to have no fixed tooling, which is hoped to allow it to be rapidly reconfigured and autonomous. A new 93,000-square-metre (1,000,000 sq ft) factory was announced in June 2021, with Relativity set to takeover the former Boeing C-17 production plant in January 2022 to begin production of its Terran R reusable launch vehicle.

Stennis Space Center 

In March 2018, Relativity Space signed a 20-year lease at the Stennis Space Center in Mississippi, a NASA rocket testing facility, to test engine components and eventually full-scale test their Aeon 1 rocket engines. And in June 2019, Relativity Space expanded their work with the Stennis Space Center to include exclusive use of  within Building 9101. In mid-2019, Relativity Space planned to create 200 jobs and invest US$59 million in Mississippi over the course of this nine-year lease, which carries an option to extend for another 10 years.

Cape Canaveral LC-16 
In January 2019, Relativity Space announced that it won a competitive bidding process with the United States Air Force to build and operate Launch Complex 16 (LC-16) at Cape Canaveral Space Force Station in Florida. LC-16 has historical significance having been previously used by the US military to launch Titan and Pershing ballistic missiles.

Vandenberg Space Force Base Building 330 
In June 2020, Relativity Space announced it plans to develop a second launch pad at Vandenberg Space Force Base in California to launch payloads into polar orbits and Sun-synchronous orbits, including the Iridium satellite launches, between 2023 and 2030.

Products

Launch vehicles

Terran 1 

Terran 1 is an expendable launch vehicle under development that will consist of two stages. The first stage uses nine Aeon 1 engines, while the second stage uses a single vacuum-optimized Aeon 1 engine. The maximum payload was expected to be  to  low Earth orbit (LEO), normal payload  to  Sun-synchronous orbit (SSO), high-altitude payload  to  SSO. Relativity's advertised launch price was US$12 million per Terran 1 mission in June 2020. Relativity hopes to conduct the first launch of Terran 1 on March 22, 2023 after three scrubbed launches attempts.

Terran R 

Terran R is a medium-lift two-stage, fully reusable launch vehicle planned by Relativity Space. The first stage will use seven Aeon R engines, whilst the second stage will use an upgraded Aeon 1 engine with a copper chamber.

Rocket engines

Aeon 1 
The engine is powered by liquid natural gas (LNG) and liquid oxygen (LOX). It is made out of a proprietary 3D-printed alloy. It is printed by selective laser sintering and assembled from fewer than 100 parts. By February 2022, Relativity Space had completed 500+ test firings of its Aeon 1 engine, using the E-3 test facility at NASA's Stennis Space Center.

Aeon R 
The Aeon R engine is under development to produce over 250,000 pounds-force (1,100 kN) of thrust. A single Aeon R will power a future upgrade of Terran 1, and eight or more Aeon R engines are planned to power the first stage of Terran R.

Stargate 
In order to 3D print large components such as rocket tanks and airframes, Relativity Space has created a system named Stargate, which it claims is the world's largest 3D printer of metals. Stargate uses existing welding technology to melt metal wire, layer by layer, into precise and complex structures that have minimal joints and parts. The company aims at 3D-printing at least 95% of their launcher, including the engines, by the end of 2020. The company plans to eventually 3D-print a complete launch vehicle within 60 days.

Launch contracts 

, Relativity Space has pre-sold more launches than any other company in the private space industry since SpaceX.

On 5 April 2019, Relativity Space announced its first signed contract, with Telesat, a Canadian telecom satellite operator. The terms of this contract were not specified, but it did include "multiple" launches of Terran 1.

Relativity Space publicly announced their contract with mu Space in April 2019. It is expected that Relativity Space will launch a mu Space satellite to low Earth orbit in the second half of 2022, aboard Relativity's Terran 1 rocket.

In May 2019, Relativity Space signed a contract with Spaceflight Industries, a satellite rideshare and mission management provider, to launch Spaceflight's dedicated smallsat rideshares. The terms of this deal were not disclosed, however, it was shared that the contract included one launch of Relativity's Terran 1 rocket in the third quarter of 2021, with an option for an unspecified number of additional launches.

In September 2019, Relativity Space and Momentus Space announced their launch service agreement at the 2019 World Satellite Business Week in Paris. The agreement stated that Relativity's Terran 1 launch vehicles will carry Momentus' Vigoride space tug service vehicles into orbit. The contract is for one launch, with an option for five additional missions.

In June 2020, Relativity Space announced that they signed a new launch contract with Iridium. This contract included up to six dedicated launches to deploy ground spare satellites to low Earth orbit (LEO) for Iridium NEXT's constellation on Relativity's Terran 1 vehicle. According to Suzi McBride, Iridium's COO, the satellite communication provider chose to partner with Relativity Space because of their flexible launch capability and the company's ability to launch one satellite at a time. According to the deal these launches will not begin earlier than 2023.

Lockheed Martin announced on 16 October 2020, that it will launch a cryogenic liquid hydrogen management demonstration mission on Terran 1. Lockheed Martin also specified that the launch will make use of Momentus' Vigoride orbital transfer vehicle to house the cryogenic payload. This announcement came two days after NASA announced the recipients of its Tipping Point awards.

OneWeb announced on 30 June 2022 that it signed the first contract for Terran R launches, with a value of over $1.2 billion for more than 20 launches starting in 2025.

See also 
 List of private spaceflight companies

References

External links 
 

Aerospace companies of the United States
Private spaceflight companies
Rocket engine manufacturers of the United States
Spacecraft manufacturers
Manufacturing companies based in Greater Los Angeles
Technology companies based in Greater Los Angeles
Companies based in Los Angeles County, California
Manufacturing companies established in 2015
Technology companies established in 2015
2015 establishments in California